Samuel James Edgar (born 23 September 1913 in Lisburn, County Antrim; died 31 January 1937 in Lisburn) was an Irish cricketer.

A right-handed batsman and a right-arm medium pace bowler, he played twice for the Ireland cricket team against the MCC in 1934. He made his debut in a two-day match in Strabane in July, scoring 103 opening the batting in the first innings. His second, and final, match was a first-class match at Trinity College in Dublin the following month.

References

1913 births
1937 deaths
Irish cricketers
Sportspeople from Lisburn
Cricketers from Northern Ireland